Vartiania drangianica is a moth in the family Cossidae. It is found in Iran.

The wingspan is about 37 mm.

References

Natural History Museum Lepidoptera generic names catalog

Moths described in 1902
Cossinae